Pine Grove Furnace may refer to:

Pine Grove Furnace (1764), in the Pine Grove Iron Works of Cumberland County, Pennsylvania
Pine Grove Furnace State Park, established to protect the above
Pine Grove Furnace (1805), near Uniontown, Pennsylvania
Pine-Grove Furnace (1828), in Lawrence County, Ohio
Pine Grove Bloomary Forge (1837), in Washington County, Tennessee